Ma Yuan (马元) is a character from the Chinese novel Fengshen Yanyi. Ma Yuan is described as a human eating demon who became a Buddha.

Legend
In Fengshen Yanyi, Ma Yuan was an immortal who lived in the Baigu Cave of Kulu Mountain. He loved to eat human hearts and had a magical third hand behind his head that could be stretched to catch people to eat. King Zhou had a son named Ying Hong who once came to the aid of Ma Yaun. He was finally captured by Wenshu Guangfa Tianzun. Wenshu Guangfa Tianzun tried to kill him because he was not named on the "Honored God List". He was still a predestined person in the Western Heaven, but he was rescued by Zhunti Daoren under the Western teachings and was taken to Western Heaven. After being converted to Buddhism, he became the Ma Yuan Zunwang Buddha (马元尊王佛).

References

Chinese deities
Chinese gods
Buddhas
Investiture of the Gods characters